Regina Cobb is a former Republican member of the Arizona House of Representatives representing Arizona's Legislative District Five.

A dentist, she graduated from Case Western Reserve University in 1993 and currently practices at Kingman, Arizona. She was President of the Arizona Dental Association in 2009.

She was a candidate in the 2022 Arizona State Treasurer election, but withdrew the 1st of September, 2021.

Elections
 2014 - Cobb and Sonny Borrelli defeated Jennifer Jones, Sam Medrano and George Schnittgrund in the Republican primary. Borrelli and Cobb defeated Longoria and Weisser in the general election with Borrelli receiving 31,277 votes.

References

External links
 

Republican Party members of the Arizona House of Representatives
Living people
American dentists
Case Western Reserve University alumni
Women state legislators in Arizona
21st-century American politicians
21st-century American women politicians
Year of birth missing (living people)
Women dentists